Mauro Barni (1927-2017) was an Italian physician, professor and politician.

Professor Barni was rector of the University of Siena from 1970 to 1979.

He served as Mayor of Siena from 1979 to 1983.

References

Bibliography

1927 births
2017 deaths
Mayors of Siena
Italian Socialist Party politicians
Academic staff of the University of Siena